Morgan Hill station is a Caltrain station located in the downtown area of Morgan Hill, California. The station is only served during weekday peak hours, with northbound trains in the morning and southbound trains in the evening.

The original Southern Pacific station opened in 1899 as Morganhill. The railroad closed the station in November 1958. VTA rebuilt the station for an extension to Caltrain in 1992.

The station will eventually be served by Amtrak when the Capitol Corridor is extended to Salinas station.

References

External links

Caltrain - Morgan Hill
VTA - Morgan Hill Caltrain Station

Caltrain stations in Santa Clara County, California
Future Amtrak stations in the United States
Railway stations in the United States opened in 1992
Railway stations closed in 1958
Railway stations in the United States opened in 1899
Former Southern Pacific Railroad stations in California